In the geometry of hyperbolic 4-space, the order-5 120-cell honeycomb is one of five compact regular space-filling tessellations (or honeycombs). With Schläfli symbol {5,3,3,5}, it has five 120-cells around each face. It is self-dual. It also has 600 120-cells around each vertex.

Related honeycombs
It is related to the (order-3) 120-cell honeycomb, and order-4 120-cell honeycomb. It is analogous to the order-5 dodecahedral honeycomb and order-5 pentagonal tiling.

Birectified order-5 120-cell honeycomb  
The birectified order-5 120-cell honeycomb  constructed by all rectified 600-cells, with octahedron and icosahedron cells, and triangle faces with a 5-5 duoprism vertex figure and has extended symmetry [[5,3,3,5]].

See also 
 List of regular polytopes

References 
Coxeter, Regular Polytopes, 3rd. ed., Dover Publications, 1973. . (Tables I and II: Regular polytopes and honeycombs, pp. 294–296)
Coxeter, The Beauty of Geometry: Twelve Essays, Dover Publications, 1999  (Chapter 10: Regular honeycombs in hyperbolic space, Summary tables II,III,IV,V, p212-213)

Honeycombs (geometry)
Self-dual tilings